Morgans is a surname. People with the surname include:

 Aimee Morgans, British engineer
 Alf Morgans (1850–1933), premier of Western Australia
Kenny Morgans (1939–2012), Welsh association football player
 Gwyn Morgans (born 1932), Welsh association football player
Morgan Morgans (1806–1889), American politician
Morgan Morgans (engineer) (1814–1888), Welsh civil engineer

See also 

 Morgans (disambiguation)
 Morgan (surname)